The meridian 79° west of Greenwich is a line of longitude that extends from the North Pole across the Arctic Ocean, North America, the Atlantic Ocean, the Caribbean Sea, Panama, South America, the Pacific Ocean, the Southern Ocean, and Antarctica to the South Pole.

The 79th meridian west forms a great circle with the 101st meridian east.

From Pole to Pole
Starting at the North Pole and heading south to the South Pole, the 79th meridian west passes through:

{| class="wikitable plainrowheaders"
! scope="col" width="120" | Co-ordinates
! scope="col" | Country, territory or sea
! scope="col" | Notes
|-
| style="background:#b0e0e6;" | 
! scope="row" style="background:#b0e0e6;" | Arctic Ocean
| style="background:#b0e0e6;" |
|-
| 
! scope="row" | 
| Nunavut — Ellesmere Island
|-
| style="background:#b0e0e6;" | 
! scope="row" style="background:#b0e0e6;" | Glacier Strait
| style="background:#b0e0e6;" |
|-
| 
! scope="row" | 
| Nunavut — Coburg Island
|-
| style="background:#b0e0e6;" | 
! scope="row" style="background:#b0e0e6;" | Baffin Bay
| style="background:#b0e0e6;" |
|-
| 
! scope="row" | 
| Nunavut — Bylot Island
|-
| style="background:#b0e0e6;" | 
! scope="row" style="background:#b0e0e6;" | Eclipse Sound
| style="background:#b0e0e6;" |
|-
| 
! scope="row" | 
| Nunavut — Emmerson Island, Frechette Island and Baffin Island
|-valign="top"
| style="background:#b0e0e6;" | 
! scope="row" style="background:#b0e0e6;" | Foxe Basin
| style="background:#b0e0e6;" | Passing just west of Koch Island, Nunavut,  (at )
|-
| 
! scope="row" | 
| Nunavut — Rowley Island
|-valign="top"
| style="background:#b0e0e6;" | 
! scope="row" style="background:#b0e0e6;" | Foxe Basin
| style="background:#b0e0e6;" | Passing just west of North Spicer Island, Nunavut,  (at )
|-
| 
! scope="row" | 
| Nunavut — South Spicer Island
|-
| style="background:#b0e0e6;" | 
! scope="row" style="background:#b0e0e6;" | Foxe Basin
| style="background:#b0e0e6;" |
|-
| style="background:#b0e0e6;" | 
! scope="row" style="background:#b0e0e6;" | Foxe Channel
| style="background:#b0e0e6;" |
|-valign="top"
| style="background:#b0e0e6;" | 
! scope="row" style="background:#b0e0e6;" | Hudson Bay
| style="background:#b0e0e6;" | Passing just west of Elsie Island, Nunavut,  (at )
|-
| 
! scope="row" | 
| Nunavut — Flaherty Island and Innetalling Island
|-valign="top"
| style="background:#b0e0e6;" | 
! scope="row" style="background:#b0e0e6;" | Hudson Bay
| style="background:#b0e0e6;" | Passing just east of Long Island, Nunavut,  (at )
|-
| 
! scope="row" | 
| Quebec
|-
| style="background:#b0e0e6;" | 
! scope="row" style="background:#b0e0e6;" | James Bay
| style="background:#b0e0e6;" | Passing west of Waskaganish (Fort Rupert, Quebec) at 
|-valign="top"
| 
! scope="row" | 
| Quebec Ontario — from 
|-
| style="background:#b0e0e6;" | 
! scope="row" style="background:#b0e0e6;" | Lake Ontario
| style="background:#b0e0e6;" |
|-valign="top"
| 
! scope="row" | 
| New York — passing just east of Niagara Falls (at ) and west of Lockport (at )
|-
| 
! scope="row" | 
| Ontario
|-
| style="background:#b0e0e6;" | 
! scope="row" style="background:#b0e0e6;" | Lake Erie
| style="background:#b0e0e6;" |
|-valign="top"
| 
! scope="row" | 
| New York — Grand Island and the Niagara River near Buffalo Pennsylvania — from  Maryland — from  West Virginia — from  Virginia — passing just east of Staunton at  North Carolina — passing just west of Durham at  South Carolina — from 
|-valign="top"
| style="background:#b0e0e6;" | 
! scope="row" style="background:#b0e0e6;" | Atlantic Ocean
| style="background:#b0e0e6;" | Passing just west of Grand Bahama,  (at )
|-
| 
! scope="row" | 
| Cayo Santa Maria and the mainland
|-
| style="background:#b0e0e6;" | 
! scope="row" style="background:#b0e0e6;" | Caribbean Sea
| style="background:#b0e0e6;" |
|-
| 
! scope="row" | 
| Doce Leguas Cays
|-
| style="background:#b0e0e6;" | 
! scope="row" style="background:#b0e0e6;" | Caribbean Sea
| style="background:#b0e0e6;" |
|-
| 
! scope="row" | 
|
|-
| style="background:#b0e0e6;" | 
! scope="row" style="background:#b0e0e6;" | Pacific Ocean
| style="background:#b0e0e6;" | Gulf of Panama
|-
| 
! scope="row" | 
| Pearl Islands
|-
| style="background:#b0e0e6;" | 
! scope="row" style="background:#b0e0e6;" | Pacific Ocean
| style="background:#b0e0e6;" |
|-
| 
! scope="row" | 
| Westernmost point
|-
| style="background:#b0e0e6;" | 
! scope="row" style="background:#b0e0e6;" | Pacific Ocean
| style="background:#b0e0e6;" | Ancón de Sardinas Bay
|-
| 
! scope="row" | 
|
|-
| 
! scope="row" | 
|
|-
| style="background:#b0e0e6;" | 
! scope="row" style="background:#b0e0e6;" | Pacific Ocean
| style="background:#b0e0e6;" |
|-
| 
! scope="row" | 
| Islands of Robinson Crusoe and Santa Clara
|-
| style="background:#b0e0e6;" | 
! scope="row" style="background:#b0e0e6;" | Pacific Ocean
| style="background:#b0e0e6;" |
|-
| style="background:#b0e0e6;" | 
! scope="row" style="background:#b0e0e6;" | Southern Ocean
| style="background:#b0e0e6;" |
|-valign="top"
| 
! scope="row" | Antarctica
|-
|}

See also
78th meridian west
80th meridian west

w079 meridian west